Sir John Boardman,  (born 20 August 1927) is a classical archaeologist and art historian. He has been described as "Britain's most distinguished historian of ancient Greek art."

Biography
John Boardman was educated at Chigwell School (1938–1945); then Magdalene College, Cambridge, where he read Classics beginning in 1945.  After completing two years' national service in the Intelligence Corps he spent three years in Greece, from 1952 to 1955, as the Assistant Director of the British School at Athens. He married Sheila Stanford in 1952 (d. 2005), and has two children, Julia and Mark.
 
On his return to England in 1955, Boardman took up the post of Assistant Keeper at the Ashmolean Museum in Oxford, thus beginning his lifelong affiliation with it. In 1959 he was appointed Reader in Classical Archaeology in the University of Oxford, and in 1963 was appointed a Fellow of Merton College. Here he remained until his appointment as Lincoln Professor of Classical Art and Archaeology, a position previously held by John Beazley, and the concomitant Fellowship of Lincoln College in 1978. He was knighted in 1989 and retired in 1994, and is now Emeritus Professor.

John Boardman is a Fellow of the British Academy, from whom he received the Kenyon Medal in 1995. He was awarded the Onassis Prize for Humanities in 2009.

He is an Honorary Fellow of Magdalene College, Cambridge, and of Merton and Lincoln Colleges in Oxford, as well as the holder of many other academic distinctions.

He has carried out archaeological excavations at many sites, including in Smyrna, Crete, Emporio in Chios and at Tocra in Libya. His voluminous publications focus primarily on the art and architecture of ancient Greece, and in particular on sculpture, engraved gems, and vase-painting.

He is the author of the book The Greeks Overseas, on the ancient Greek diaspora throughout the Mediterranean, in which Greek populations from the Aegean region, Greek coastal mainland and Western Turkey settled the coastal regions of Italy, North Africa, southern France, reaching as far as southern Spain. The book has now undergone four editions, as new archaeological research emerges.

Selected publications
The Cretan Collection in Oxford (1961)
Excavations at Emporio, Chios (1964)
The Greeks Overseas (1st ed. 1964; rev. ed. 1973; 3rd ed. 1980; 4th ed. 1999)
The Cretan Collection in Oxford (1961)
The Date of the Knossos Tablets (1963)
Island Gems (1963)
Excavations at Tocra (with J. Hayes, 1966, 1973)
Archaic Greek Gems (1968)
Greek Gems and Finger Rings (1970, 2001)
Greek Burial Customs (1971) with D.C. Kurtz
CVA Ashmolean Museum 3 (1975)
CVA Castle Ashby, with M. Robertson (1980)
 The Diffusion of Classical Art in Antiquity, a volume based on his series of Andrew Mellon Lectures at the National Gallery of Art, Washington, D.C. in 1993.
4 Handbooks on Greek Vase Painting
3 Handbooks on Greek Sculpture
10 handbooks and collection catalogues on ancient gems and rings
 Persia and the West (2000)The History of Greek Vases (2001)The Archaeology of Nostalgia (2002)Greece and the Hellenistic World (2002)The World of Ancient Art (2006)The Marlborough Gems (2009)The Relief Plaques of Central Asia and China (2009/10)The Triumph of Dionysos (2014)The Greeks in Asia (2015)Greek Art, 'The World of Art Library' series (first ed. 1964; latest ed. 2016)Alexander the Great: From His Death to the Present Day (2019)

References

Sources
 Who's Who'', 2006.
Dictionary of Art Historians:Boardman, John
Beazley Archive

External links
Magdalene College: Famous alumni

English archaeologists
English art historians
Classical archaeologists
English classical scholars
Alumni of Magdalene College, Cambridge
Fellows of Lincoln College, Oxford
Fellows of Magdalene College, Cambridge
Fellows of Merton College, Oxford
Fellows of the British Academy
Knights Bachelor
1927 births
Living people
Lincoln Professors of Classical Archaeology and Art
English male non-fiction writers
Officers of the Order of the British Empire